La Plaine may refer to:

 La Plaine, Dominica, a village on the eastern side of the island
 La Plaine, Geneva, a village in Dardagny Municipality, Switzerland
 La Plaine, Maine-et-Loire, a commune in western France
 La Plaine, Quebec, a small town that is now part of Terrebonne, Quebec
 La Plaine au Bois, a site of a massacre in Wormhout, Nord, France during World War II
 La Plaine-sur-Mer, a commune in the Loire-Atlantique department in western France
 The Plain, the party of moderates in revolutionary-era France.
 Gare de La Plaine-Stade de France, a station in Saint-Denis, Seine-Saint-Denis, France
 a lieu-dit in Ledringhem in northern France
 a house in St Bernard's Catholic Grammar School in Langley, Berkshire, England
 La Plaine (Dominica constituency), electoral district in Dominica

See also 
 Plaine (disambiguation)